Yang Fuqing (died 1874), born in Mei County (now Meixian District), Guangdong, was a rebel leader during the middle and late Taiping Rebellion against the Qing government in 1855-1874. He was given the title tou wang.

In 1858, Yang Fuqing defeated Wei Jun, who surrendered to the Qing government, and occupied the Chizhou for Taiping. He is sometimes mentioned as participating in the Northern Expedition, but other sources contradict this. In 1864, the Taiping Rebellion ended with defeat to the Nanjing, and Yang fled to America from Shanghai by ship. Yang Fuqing created a Chinese gang in Los Angeles, California in 1866.  He was a young brother-in-law to Yang Xiuqing.

Yang returned to China and was arrested during the siege of Fuzhou in 1874. He joined the Green Standard Army and organized an anti-Qing espionage unit. This was discovered by colonel Wei Jun and Brigadier General Ma Ronghe. He was killed in Fuzhou. Some sources claim that this was not actually Yang's fate, but that of another, unnamed Taiping general.

References

Jonathan D. Spence - God's Chinese Son. 1996 Norton
Tiān Guó Zhi

1874 deaths
Military leaders of the Taiping Rebellion
Triad members
Chinese crime bosses
Hakka generals
People from Meixian District
Year of birth unknown
Generals from Guangdong
Chinese expatriates in the United States
Members of the Green Standard Army
People executed by the Qing dynasty